Fox Peak is a small club skifield located  to the east of Lake Tekapo in New Zealand's South Island. The original name for the mountain was Rowley Peak, named after Thomas Rowley of the Canterbury Association, who was Dean-designate of ChristChurch Cathedral, but who never emigrated to New Zealand.

See also
 List of ski areas and resorts in New Zealand

External links
http://www.foxpeak.co.nz/

References

Ski areas and resorts in Canterbury, New Zealand